The MF Lastovo is a ferry owned by Croatian shipping company Jadrolinija that operates on local routes. The ship was built in Japan's Kurushima Dock Co. Ltd. for Japanese company Shikoku Chuo Ferry Boat K.K to serve the route between Kawanoe and Kobe. In 1978 the ship was bought by Jadrolinija and renamed, firstly to Partizanka, then, in the same year, to Lastovo I. In the year 1998 the ship was renamed to Lastovo.

Accidents
On Aug 15, 1993, around 7 PM (CEST), while Lastovo I was at a position around 2 nmi from Ubli, the fire broke out in the engine room. The ship had managed to dock, but the fire was extinguished just on Aug 16, 3:30 AM. The badly damaged ship was towed to Split's north port Vranjic. Since the damage was great, the possibility of sending the ship to a scrapyard was considered, but it was finally rejected, and the Jadran-Brodoremont d.o.o. completed the repair on Aug 4, 1994, with new engines installed.

References

Passenger ships
Ferries of Croatia
1969 ships